Gus Jerome Solomon (August 29, 1906 – February 15, 1987) was a United States district judge of the United States District Court for the District of Oregon.

Education and career

Born in Portland, Oregon, Solomon was the child of immigrant Jewish parents, his father having been born in Romania and his mother in Russia. Solomon received a Bachelor of Philosophy degree from the University of Chicago in 1926 and a Bachelor of Laws from Stanford Law School in 1929. He was in private practice in Portland from 1929 to 1949, first individually and then in partnership with Raymond M. Kell. The Portland law firm of Kell, Alterman & Runstein traces its origin to his practice.

Federal judicial service

On October 21, 1949, Solomon received a recess appointment from President Harry S. Truman to a new seat on the United States District Court for the District of Oregon created by 63 Stat. 493. Formally nominated to the same seat by President Truman on January 5, 1950, he was confirmed by the United States Senate on June 27, 1950, and received his commission on July 5, 1950. He served as Chief Judge from 1958 to 1971 and as a member of the Judicial Conference of the United States from 1963 to 1965, assuming senior status on September 1, 1971 and serving in that capacity until his death on February 15, 1987.

Honor

The Gus J. Solomon United States Courthouse was named in his honor.

See also
List of Jewish American jurists

References

Sources
 

1906 births
1987 deaths
American people of Romanian-Jewish descent
American people of Russian-Jewish descent
Jews and Judaism in Portland, Oregon
Judges of the United States District Court for the District of Oregon
Lawyers from Portland, Oregon
Stanford Law School alumni
United States district court judges appointed by Harry S. Truman
20th-century American judges
University of Chicago alumni
20th-century American lawyers